The battle of Marinka is an ongoing battle taking place in the city of Marinka between the Armed Forces of Russia and the separatist Donetsk People's Republic against the Armed Forces of Ukraine. Shelling of the town intensified between 17 February and 22 February 2022, when Russia recognized the DPR as independent, and fighting began in the town on 17 March. 

In June 2015, Marinka had been the site of a one-day battle near Marinka, the first serious conflict after the February signing of Minsk II, in which Ukrainian forces held back a DPR attack.

Prelude 
Initial shelling of Marinka began on 17 February, when DPR forces injured an aid worker. Shelling began around 9:30 AM, and ended at 2:30 PM, with around 20 explosions total. Shelling intensified in the days leading up to the 2022 Russian invasion of Ukraine, killing two Ukrainian soldiers and injuring four more.

Battle 
Fighting for the city itself began around 17 March 2022, when the Russian Ministry of Defense falsely claimed that DPR forces had captured Marinka. On 30-31 March, Ukrainian emergency services extinguished "dozens of fires" that had started in the town because of white phosphorus munitions from Russian forces. 

In mid-April, during the beginning of the battle of Donbas, Russian and DPR forces ramped up offensive operations, launching multiple attacks on Marinka.  On 17 April, two people were killed and four were injured after Russian forces shelled the city. Two days later on 19 April, Ukrainian forces regained full control of Marinka after a failed Russian assault the day prior. Ukrainian forces repelled Russian attacks on the town on the 23, 25, and 26 of April.

Following the end of the siege of Mariupol, the ISW reported on 20 May that Russian and DPR forces refocused their efforts towards Marinka, allocating more forces following the end of the siege of Mariupol. Throughout May, southern Marinka shifted between Ukrainian and Russian control as fighting intensified. Further Russian assaults on 25 June were repelled by Ukraine. The Russian Ministry of Defence claimed on 3 July that Ukraine's 54th Mechanized Brigade has lost "more than 60% of its personnel and equipment" during clashes in Marinka, although these claims could not be verified. 

Fighting intensified from late July through early August, beginning with a failed Russian attack on Marinka on 11 July. Two more assaults occurred on 30 July and 1 August, with little success. On 5 August, DPR and Wagner forces claimed to control half of Marinka. Russian forces assaulted Marinka again on 25 August, although made no gains. Throughout August, Russian forces made incremental gains in Marinka. The ISW reported that the frontline in Marinka largely stagnated throughout September. In October, geolocated footage showed Russian troops had advanced around the C051101 highway north of Marinka.

Starting in early November, fighting intensified again with pro-Russian sources claiming marginal gains in the town, although providing no visual evidence. By 13 December, Russian-DPR forces controlled 70% of Marinka, with Ukrainian forces controlling the western half of the town past Druzhba street. DPR president Denis Pushilin claimed that Russian forces would "soon" take control of Marinka. Donetsk Oblast governor Pavlo Kyrylenko stated on 22 December that Marinka and the surrounding areas were "unlivable", and that there is "not a single surviving house". On 24 December, the Russian Ministry of Defence claimed to have made gains inside Marinka, although Ukrainian forces are deeply entrenched inside the center of the town. Ukraine claimed to have repelled Russian assaults in Marinka.

In January 2023, interviewed Ukrainian soldiers stated that fighting in Marinka was "hellish", and that much of the fighting was from 10 to 20 meters away. Because much of the town is destroyed, fighting takes place behind rubble, household objects, and basements. Press Colonel Yaroslav Chepurnyi stated the 79th Air Assault Brigade suffered "the most losses" of the Ukrainian units stationed in Marinka. On 1 February, Ukraine claimed to have inflicted "significant losses' on a Russian attack towards Marinka. On February 8, former Deputy Interior Minister of the Vitaly Kiselev claimed that elements of the 150th Motorized Rifle Division were consolidating positions in parts of western Marinka. According to the Ukrainian General Staff, clashes intensified on February 2 with thirteen battles lasting two hours in Marinka. On February 21, further Russian assaults on Marinka were repelled.

Humanitarian impact 
Almost all of Marinka was destroyed in the fighting. The town square was completely destroyed, the golden dome of the local church was partially melted, and the Marinka cultural centre was destroyed. The primary school of the city, Marinka school No.1, was destroyed, with the nearby youth center, destroyed sometime before 15 April 2022, with only one wall left standing.

On 3 November 2022, Ukraine claimed to have evacuated the civilian population of Marinka, totaling around 9,400 people pre-war. Evacuation efforts were done by Ukrainian paramedic group White Angels.

References

Marinka
Marinka
March 2022 events in Ukraine
April 2022 events in Ukraine
May 2022 events in Ukraine
June 2022 events in Ukraine
January 2023 events in Ukraine
Marinka
History of Donetsk Oblast
War crimes during the 2022 Russian invasion of Ukraine
Marinka